Nasiba Bakhruzovna Gasanova (born 15 December 1994) is a Russian footballer who plays as a wing-back and as a forward for Rostov at the Russian Women's Football Championship.

Gasanova played for Russia U19 team. She was included by coach Elena Fomina in the 23-players squad that represented Russia at the UEFA Women's Euro 2017, although she didn't play any of the team's matches in the competition. After the tournament, Gasanova became an important part of the Russian team, featuring in several matches for the team.

References

External links
 
 
 

1994 births
Living people
Russia women's international footballers
Russian women's footballers
Women's association football defenders
Women's association football forwards
Universiade medalists in football
Universiade bronze medalists for Russia
Kubanochka Krasnodar players
WFC Krasnodar players
Russian sportspeople of Azerbaijani descent
Medalists at the 2019 Summer Universiade
UEFA Women's Euro 2017 players
21st-century Russian women